The discography of American rock band Eagles of Death Metal contains four studio albums and twelve singles.

Peace, Love, Death Metal, their debut studio album, was released on 23 March 2004. Several songs from the album were used in American television commercials including those for Ask.com, Comcast, Payless ShoeSource, Nissan Motors, Budweiser, Pontiac Motors, Wendy's, as well as in the trailer for the film Thank You for Smoking and for a promotional disc for the film Grindhouse which was available prior to the film's release at Hot Topic stores. The first song on the album, "I Only Want You," was also used on the soundtrack for the PS2 game Gran Turismo 4, as well as by Microsoft in advertising for the launch of Windows 8. "Miss Alissa" was featured on Nike's FIFA World Cup 2014 campaign video. The video is entitled "Winner stays" and featured footballers Cristiano Ronaldo, Andrea Pirlo, Neymar, Tim Howard and many others.

Death by Sexy, their second studio album, was released on 11 April 2006. The track "Chase the Devil" from the album was included in the soundtrack for Tony Hawk's Project 8. The track "Don't Speak (I Came to Make a Bang!)" was also part of the soundtrack for Electronic Arts' Need for Speed: Carbon. "Cherry Cola" was used in a Microsoft Zune commercial, and "Don't Speak" was featured in Epic Movie, where the band is seen playing it live; in addition, the song was used in a Guy Ritchie-directed Nike ad ahead of UEFA Euro 2008.

Heart On, their third studio album, was released on 28 October 2008. The single from the third album "Wannabe in L.A." is in the game Midnight Club: Los Angeles. The song  also features in the music rhythm game Guitar Hero 5 and the racing game DiRT 2. "I'm Your Torpedo" and "High Voltage" were also featured in the 2009 Austin set film Whip It. "Now I'm A Fool" was used in the 2012 film Silver Linings Playbook. The track "High Voltage" was featured in an online campaign for Head & Shoulders in 2010.

Zipper Down, their fourth studio album, was released on 2 October 2015. The first single from the album "Complexity" was made available for streaming on Pitchfork Media's website. On 13 November 2015, the band was playing a sold-out concert to about 1,500 guests at Le Bataclan theatre in Paris, when the venue was attacked by terrorists, who killed at least 89 concertgoers. Following the attack, a Facebook campaign was created with the intention of getting the band's cover of the Duran Duran song  "Save a Prayer" to number one on the UK Singles Chart. The campaign was promoted by Duran Duran, who promised to donate their proceeds from the sale to charity.

Albums

Studio albums

Singles

As lead artist

Other appearances

Videos

References

Discographies of American artists
Rock music group discographies